46th parallel may refer to:

46th parallel north, a circle of latitude in the Northern Hemisphere
46th parallel south, a circle of latitude in the Southern Hemisphere